Parkville  may refer to:

Places
United States
 Parkville, a neighborhood of Hartford, Connecticut, United States
 Parkville, Maryland
 Parkville, Michigan
 Parkville, Missouri, a suburb of Kansas City
 Parkville, Pennsylvania

Australia
 Parkville, Victoria, an inner suburb of Melbourne, Victoria, Australia
 Parkville, New South Wales, a small town near Scone, New South Wales, Australia

Transportation
Parkville railway station, in Melbourne, Victoria, Australia
Parkville station (Connecticut), in Hartford, Connecticut, United States

See also
Parkeville, Indiana
Parksville (disambiguation)